was a Japanese football player.

Death
On 19 July 2010, Daiki Sato died cause of heart attack.

Club statistics

References

External links

1988 births
2010 deaths
Association football people from Chiba Prefecture
Japanese footballers
J2 League players
Thespakusatsu Gunma players
Association football midfielders